Exact Change is an American independent book publishing company founded in 1989 by Damon Krukowski and Naomi Yang who, outside of their publishing careers, were musicians associated with  Galaxie 500 and Damon and Naomi. The company specialises in re-publishing 19th- and 20th-century avant-garde literature and has published works by John Cage, Salvador Dalí and Denton Welch among many others.

Selected publications
 The Heresiarch & Co., The Poet Assassinated - Guillaume Apollinaire
 The Adventures of Telemachus, Paris Peasant - Louis Aragon
 Watchfiends and Rack Screams - Antonin Artaud
 Composition in Retrospect - John Cage
 The Hearing Trumpet - Leonora Carrington
 Hebdomeros - Giorgio de Chirico
 Oui - Salvador Dalí
 Give My Regards to Eighth Street - Morton Feldman
 The Death and Letters of Alice James - Alice James
 The Supermale, Exploits & Opinions of Dr. Faustroll, Pataphysician - Alfred Jarry
 The Blue Octavo Notebooks - Franz Kafka
 Maldoror and the complete works - Comte de Lautréamont
 Immemory (CD-ROM) - Chris Marker
 Aurélia and other writings - Gérard de Nerval
 The Book of Disquiet, The Education of the Stoic - Fernando Pessoa 
 The Burial of the Count of Orgaz & other poems - Pablo Picasso
 How I wrote Certain of my Books - Raymond Roussel PPPPPP - Kurt Schwitters
 Everybody's Autobiography - Gertrude Stein
 In Youth is Pleasure - Denton Welch
 Slow Under Construction'' - André Breton, Paul Eluard and Rene Char

References

External links
 Official Exact Change website

Book publishing companies of the United States
Publishing companies established in 1990